

Billiatt is a locality in the Australian state of South Australia located in the south-east of the state in the Murray Mallee region about  north-east of the state capital of Adelaide.

Its boundaries were created on 28 September 2000 for the "long established local name".  Its name is derived from the Billiatt Conservation Park and the cadastral unit of the Hundred of Billiatt.

The principal land use within the locality is conservation with the majority of its land area being occupied by the Billiatt Wilderness Protection Area.

The 2016 Australian census which was conducted in August 2016 reports that Billiatt had a population of zero.

Billiatt is located within the federal Division of Barker and the state electoral district of Chaffey and the local government area of the District Council of Loxton Waikerie.

References

Towns in South Australia
Murray Mallee